An embedded style language is a kind of computer language whose commands appear intermixed with those of a base language. Such languages can either have their own syntax, which is translated into that of the base language, or can provide an API with which to invoke the behaviors of the language.  Embedded domain-specific languages are common examples of embedded style languages that rely upon translation.  Posix threads is an example of an embedded style language that uses only an API to invoke its behaviors.  Embedded style languages that are invoked via an API are distinguished from software libraries by the existence of a runtime system.

Domain-specific programming languages
Programming languages